Devante Rogea Jacobs is an English professional footballer who plays as a forward.

Playing career
Jacobs made his League One debut for Oldham Athletic on 28 February 2015, in a 4–0 defeat to Preston North End at Boundary Park. Jacobs was released by Oldham on 5 October 2015.

Statistics

References

External links

Living people
English footballers
Association football forwards
Oldham Athletic A.F.C. players
English Football League players
1996 births